Nicola or Niccolò Bettoli (3 September 1780 – 16 July 1854) was an Italian architect. Born in Parma, he is best known as the designer of the Neoclassicist Teatro Regio (Royal Theatre) of that city for Duches Marie Louise which was begun in 1821 and inaugurated on 16 May 1829.

1780 births
1854 deaths
Architects from Parma
19th-century Italian architects